Đorđe "Đole" Đogani (born Hamit Đogaj, on 1 July 1960) is a Serbian former competitive disco dancer, present day singer and founder of the music duo Đogani.

Biography 
Đorđe Đogani was born Hamit Đogaj on July 1, 1960, in Belgrade, SR Serbia, SFR Yugoslavia to a Serbian Albanian parents. He grew up in the neighborhood of Mirijevo alongside three brothers and three sisters. His youngest brother, Gazmen "Gagi" Đogani, is also a well-known 90s dancer and founder of the music act called Funky G. An active sportsman in his youth, Đogani was a member of AK Crvena Zvezda and was a junior representative of Yugoslavia in athletics.

Đogani started dancing in 1979. In the early 80s he became involved as the choreographer and got his own dance troupe at the Belgrade Youth Center. He was the only competitor from Yugoslavia at the WORLD Disco Dancing Championship in 1980, where he was placed seventh.

In 1986, he married Slađana Delibašić, with whom he has two daughters. The couple founded Giogani Fantastico in the early 90s. Together they released six studio albums.

Following his divorce from Delibašić in 2001, Đogani started dating dancer Vesna Trivić, who became the new member of the group, now called "Đogani". With Trivić he released six more albums. They have two children of their own and are not legally married.

Discography 
As Giogani Fantastiko 
 Storm (1992)
 Idemo na Mars (1994)
 Pronađi sebe  (1996)
 Granice nema (1997)
 Bensedin (1998)
 Da, to je to! (2000)

As Đogani
 Novi dan (2001)
 Dok ja ljubim (2003)
 Đogani (2005)
 Ljubav moja (2007)
 Svila (2009)
 Đogani (2015)

References

External links 
 

Yugoslav sportsmen
Singers from Belgrade
Living people
1960 births
21st-century Serbian male singers
Serbian folk-pop singers
Albanians in Serbia
20th-century Serbian male singers
Yugoslav male singers